The tarasque is a legendary creature of France.

Tarasque may also refer to:

 20mm Tarasque, an anti-aircraft gun
 Tarrasque (Dungeons & Dragons), a Dungeons and Dragons monster

See also 
 Tarascon (disambiguation)